Chai Liyuan (born September 29, 1966) is a Chinese engineer specializing in metallurgical environmental engineering. He is an academician of the Chinese Academy of Engineering (CAE) and currently serving as dean of School of Metallurgy and Environment, Central South University and director of Chinese National Engineering Research Center for Control & Treatment of Heavy Metal Pollution (CNERC-CTHMP).

Biography
He is the youngest of seven children. His father died when he was 10. He and his siblings were raised by their bachelor mother. He secondary studied at Qingyun High School. In 1985 he was accepted to Central South University, majoring in non-ferrous metal, where he obtained his doctor's degree in 1997. He did his postgraduate work under the supervision of Zhong Haiyun. In 1996 he pursued advanced studies at Nagoya University in Japan. He returned to China in 1999 and established environmental engineering discipline at Central South University. In June 2014 he was promoted to dean of its School of Metallurgy and Environment.

In 2017 he became a delegate to the 19th National Congress of the Communist Party of China.

Honours and awards
 2009 National Science Fund for Distinguished Young Scholars
 2011 "Chang Jiang Scholar" (or " Yangtze River Scholar")
 2011 State Technological Invention Award (Second Class) 
 2014 State Science and Technology Progress Award (Second Class)
 November 5, 2015 Industrial Innovation Award of the Ho Leung Ho Lee Foundation
 2018 State Technological Invention Award (Second Class) 
 November 22, 2019 Member of the Chinese Academy of Engineering (CAE)

References

External links
Chai Liyuan on Chinese National Engineering Research Center for Control & Treatment of Heavy Metal Pollution (CNERC-CTHMP)

1966 births
Living people
People from Wannian County
Engineers from Jiangxi
Central South University alumni
Nagoya University alumni
Academic staff of the Central South University
Members of the Chinese Academy of Engineering